Hennie Möring (1 August 1918 – 15 September 2001) was a Dutch footballer. He played in six matches for the Netherlands national football team from 1947 to 1949.

References

External links
 

1918 births
2001 deaths
Dutch footballers
Netherlands international footballers
Place of birth missing
Association footballers not categorized by position